Seagraves Independent School District is a public school district based in Seagraves, Texas (USA).

Located in Gaines County, the district extends into small portions of Terry and Yoakum counties.

In 2009, the school district was rated "academically acceptable" by the Texas Education Agency.

Schools
Seagraves High School (Grades 9–12)
Seagraves Junior High (Grades 6–8)
Seagraves Elementary (Grades Prekindergarten-5)

References

External links
Seagraves ISD

School districts in Gaines County, Texas
School districts in Terry County, Texas
School districts in Yoakum County, Texas